Yelena Ilyichivna Polenova (born 20 August 1983 in Uralsk, Kazakh SSR) is a Russian team handball player, playing on the Russian women's national handball team. She won gold medal with the Russian winning team in the 2005 World Women's Handball Championship in Saint Petersburg, Russia, and again in the 2007 World Women's Handball Championship in France. She won a silver medal in the 2006 European Women's Handball Championship in Sweden.

References

1983 births
Living people
People from Oral, Kazakhstan
Russian female handball players
Handball players at the 2008 Summer Olympics
Olympic handball players of Russia
Olympic silver medalists for Russia
Olympic medalists in handball
Medalists at the 2008 Summer Olympics